David Solon Louderback (October 23, 1851 – December 27, 1911) was an American politician who served in the Virginia House of Delegates.

References

External links 

1851 births
1911 deaths
Members of the Virginia House of Delegates
20th-century American politicians